Santha Thukaram is a 1963 Indian Kannada-language film directed by Sundar Rao Nadkarni and produced by B. Radhakrishna. The film stars Rajkumar, Udaykumar, K. S. Ashwath and T. N. Balakrishna. The film has musical score by Vijaya Bhaskar. It was named the National Film Award for Best Feature Film in Kannada at the 11th National Film Awards. The movie is based on the life of poet-saint Tukaram.

Cast

 Rajkumar as Tukaram
 Udaykumar
 K. S. Ashwath
 T. N. Balakrishna as Mumbaji
 C. V. Shivashankar
 P. Vadiraj
 H. R. Hanumantha Rao
 Sundar Rao
 H. Krishna Shastry
 Kupparaj
 Leelavathi as Jija
 Pandari Bai
 Rajasree as Menaka
 Kala (credited as Baby Kala) as Maada
 Suma (credited as Baby Suma) as Kashi

Soundtrack

The music was composed by Vijaya Bhaskar.

References

External links
 

1963 films
1960s Kannada-language films
Films scored by Vijaya Bhaskar
Best Kannada Feature Film National Film Award winners
Films directed by Sundar Rao Nadkarni